The Hietzinger Synagogue (German: Hietzinger Synagoge) was a synagogue in the Hietzing district of Vienna, Austria. It was destroyed during the Reichskristallnacht in November 1938.

References 
 Bob Martens, Herbert Peter: "The Destroyed Synagogues of Vienna - Virtual city walks". Vienna: LIT Verlag, 2011.

Synagoge
Synagogues destroyed during Kristallnacht (Austria)
Synagogues in Vienna
Former synagogues in Austria